Serhiy Yuriyovych Petko (born 23 January 1994) is a Ukrainian professional footballer who plays as a defender for Mynai.

Petko is a product of the UFK Kharkiv youth system. Made his debut for FC Chornomorets in the game against FC Dynamo Kyiv on 4 April 2015 in the Ukrainian Premier League.

On 27 June 2022, he decided not to extend his contract with Veres Rivne.

References

External links
 
 

1994 births
Living people
Footballers from Kharkiv
Kharkiv State College of Physical Culture 1 alumni
Ukrainian footballers
Ukraine under-21 international footballers
Association football midfielders
Ukrainian Premier League players
Ukrainian First League players
Ukrainian Second League players
FC Chornomorets Odesa players
NK Veres Rivne players
FC Zhemchuzhyna Odesa players
FC Volyn Lutsk players